The  is Japanese aerial lift line in Numazu, Shizuoka, operated by . On , the former deserted island off the shore of Numazu, the Awashima Marine Park developed a resort with the same name, which includes a hotel and a public aquarium. The aerial lift line links Honshū and the island, across the short strait. Opened in 1964, it was the first aerial lift in Japan to go over the sea, and still is the only line to do so. The line mainly functions as a gateway attraction of the park. Riders have to pay the park admission to ride the aerial lift.

The ropeway has since closed down and been dismantled.

Basic data
Distance: 
Vertical interval:

See also
List of aerial lifts in Japan

External links
 Awashima Marine Park official website
 Awashima Marine Park official website

Aerial tramways in Japan
1964 establishments in Japan